Relations between Afghanistan and Kazakhstan began in 1992.

History
Kazakhs faced persecution at the hands of the Stalinist regime in the 1930s, and many of those who fled the USSR emigrated to Afghanistan. Thousands of Kazakhs continued to reside in Afghanistan until that country's warfare period began.

Official bilateral relations began on February 12, 1992. Afghanistan opened an embassy in Almaty in 1993, while Kazakhstan opened one in Kabul in 2003.

During the civil war in Afghanistan, Kazakhstan hosted an emergency meeting with its Central Asian neighbors and Russia in 1996. The talks became the basis for a UN resolution.

In May 2011, Kazakhstan voted to send troops to Afghanistan as part of NATO's ISAF mission (although Kazakhstan is not part of NATO). It became the first ex-Soviet Central Asian state to join ISAF.

Trade turnover between the two countries amounted to 336.7 million USD in 2014.

As of 2017, Kazakhstan has provided $20 billion in humanitarian assistance to Afghanistan.

In August 2021, after the Taliban insurgents took Kabul and drove away the government, the Kazakh foreign ministry said that it does not recognize the Taliban regime as the legal Afghan government. Kazakh president Kassym-Jomart Tokayev said his country will bolster its defenses from any potential spillover threats from Afghanistan. The UN mission to Afghanistan moved its base to Kazakhstan in September.

See also
 Foreign relations of Afghanistan
 Foreign relations of Kazakhstan

References

 
Kazakhstan
Bilateral relations of Kazakhstan